Senator Scofield may refer to:

Clay Scofield, Alabama State Senate
Edward Scofield (1842–1925), Wisconsin State Senate
Edwin L. Scofield (1852–1918), Connecticut State Senate
Glenni William Scofield (1817–1891), Pennsylvania State Senate